Heavy Rocks  is the fourth studio album by Japanese band Boris, released in 2002. It is the first of three Boris albums titled Heavy Rocks, with the others released in 2011 and 2022; all feature the band exploring hard rock and heavy metal sounds.

Alternate takes of "1970" and "Wareruraido" were used for a single, while re-recordings of "Korosu" and "1970" with Michio Kurihara appear on Boris / Variations + Live in Japan.

Music videos were shot for the tracks "1970" and "Korosu" and were originally viewable on FoodUnited's website. Both videos were later included on the 2003 DVD Live at Shimokitazawa Shelter.

Track listing

Personnel

Boris
 Takeshi – vocals, bass, and guitar
 Wata – guitar and echo
 Atsuo – drums, percussions, and vocals
Guest musicians
 Lori S. – vocals on "Heavy Friends"
 Maso Yamazaki – analog synthesizer on "Dyna-Soar"
 Masami Akita – PowerBook on "Death Valley" (incorrectly attributed to "ワレルライド" in the CD liner notes)
 Eddie Legend – lead guitar on "Koei"
 Komi – vocals on "Kane"

Production
 Tetsuya "Cherry" Tochigi – main engineer
 Takumi Iyobe – assistant engineer
 Osamu Kon – assistant engineer
 Kazuhiko Itoh – assistant engineer
 Souichirou Nakamura – mastering engineer
 Higasayama "Hatchaku" Kunihito – recording crew
 Fangs Anal Satan – design
 Furuyong – logotype
 Eri Shibata – photos

Pressing history

References

External links
 
 

2002 albums
Boris (band) albums